Karungi is a locality situated in Haparanda Municipality, Norrbotten County, Sweden with 232 inhabitants in 2010. The language most spoken in the village is Meänkieli, which the first of April 2000 officially was declared as a minority language in Sweden.

Karungi is located at the Torne river where the border to Finland goes. On the Finnish side of the river, opposite to Karungi, the village Karunki (pop 483) is located. There is no bridge, but crossing the river is done by boat or on the ice. These two villages have a common history since before the national border was drawn in the river, through the village, in 1809.

Notable people 
Sven-Erik Bucht, Minister for Rural Affairs, 2014-2019

References

External link 

Populated places in Haparanda Municipality
Norrbotten
Finland–Sweden border crossings